Elections to Staffordshire County Council took place on 7 June 2001, as part of the 2001 United Kingdom local elections, and on the same day as the general election. The elections had been delayed from May 2001 due to the outbreak of foot-and-mouth disease.  All 62 seats were up for election.

Summary
The election was won by the Labour Party, with 36 seats.

Overall results

|}

References

Staffordshire
2001
2000s in Staffordshire